Airline Road may be:
 The Airline, a portion of Maine State Route 9
 Airline Road in Weidman, Michigan
 Airline Road in Eads, Tennessee
 Airline Road near Walnut Creek
 Airline Road in Norton Shores, Michigan
 Airline Road (Singapore)